Philip Pritchard (10 November 1932 – 13 April 1987) was an Australian field hockey player. He competed in the men's tournament at the 1960 Summer Olympics.

References

External links
 

1932 births
1987 deaths
Australian male field hockey players
Olympic field hockey players of Australia
Field hockey players at the 1960 Summer Olympics